Mark Norman Ellingham is a professor of mathematics at Vanderbilt University whose research concerns graph theory. With Joseph D. Horton, he is the discoverer and namesake of the Ellingham–Horton graphs, two cubic 3-vertex-connected bipartite graphs that have no Hamiltonian cycle.

Ellingham earned his Ph.D. in 1986 from the University of Waterloo under the supervision of Lawrence Bruce Richmond. In 2012, he became one of the inaugural fellows of the American Mathematical Society.

References

20th-century American mathematicians
21st-century American mathematicians
Canadian mathematicians
Graph theorists
University of Waterloo alumni
Vanderbilt University faculty
Fellows of the American Mathematical Society
Living people
Year of birth missing (living people)